Oscar Hutt (March, 1894 – date of death unknown) was an American baseball first baseman in the Negro leagues. He played with the Dayton Marcos, St. Louis Giants, Toledo Tigers, St. Louis Giants (1924), and Cleveland Elites from 1919 to 1926.

References

External links
 and Baseball-Reference Black Baseball stats and Seamheads

St. Louis Giants players
St. Louis Giants (1924) players
Dayton Marcos players
Toledo Tigers players
Cleveland Elites players
1894 births
Year of death unknown
Baseball first basemen
Baseball players from Missouri